Alliance station is an Amtrak train station in Alliance, Ohio, United States. Located at 820 East Main Street, the station consists of an uncovered platform on the south side of the east-west tracks, with a shelter and a small parking lot nearby.

Amtrak spent $1.5 million to improve the station in 2011. It built a new shelter and installed a 550-foot long concrete platform, signage and light poles. Developed by d+A Design+Architecture, LLC of Yardley, Pennsylvania, the shelter is composed primarily of rich red brick and has an enclosed, one-story waiting room with large windows. On the facades facing the street and the tracks, the waiting room is marked by stylized projecting bays faced with coursed ashlar stonework that adds texture to the overall elevation. The design is similar to the Okeechobee station (Florida), Connellsville station (Pennsylvania), and Winnemucca station (Nevada).

Alliance is served by the Capitol Limited train from Washington to Chicago. Because the station consists of only one platform, westbound trains switch to the usual eastbound tracks to pass the station. Amtrak is the only way, other than by car or the Stark Area Regional Transit Authority (SARTA) bus from elsewhere in Stark County, Ohio, for travel to Alliance, the home of Mount Union College, as the city has neither commercial bus nor airline service.

The Pennsylvanian train  served Alliance from 1998 to 2003.

The station serves the Ohio cities of Youngstown and Akron, which are forty minutes or more away by car. Canton is 30 minutes away by car.

History

The station site in earlier years served Pennsylvania Railroad, then Penn Central passenger trains northwest to Cleveland, west to Detroit, west to Chicago and east to Philadelphia and New York City. Amtrak service began at the station when the Capitol Limited was rerouted north in fall, 1990 from Canton station in Canton.

Transit connections
The Alliance Transit Center operated by the Stark Area Regional Transit Authority (SARTA) is located within walking distance of the station, which serves as a point of convergence for all routes that serve Alliance (Routes 130, 131, 135, 136, 139). However, the current early morning arrival times of the Capitol Limited make connecting to buses difficult. All SARTA service to Alliance ends three hours before the arrival of the Chicago-bound train and doesn't resume until three hours after the arrival of the Washington D.C.-bound train.

Station layout

References

External links

Alliance Amtrak Station (USA Rail Guide -- Train Web)

Amtrak stations in Ohio
Buildings and structures in Mahoning County, Ohio
Buildings and structures in Stark County, Ohio
Alliance, Ohio
Railway stations in the United States opened in 1990
1990 establishments in Ohio
Transportation in Mahoning County, Ohio
Fort Wayne Line
Former Pennsylvania Railroad stations